Malcolm Land District is a land district (cadastral division) of Western Australia, located within the Eastern Land Division in the northern Goldfields region of the state.

Location and features
The district is located in the northern Goldfields region, and contains the town of Leonora and the former towns of Gwalia, Malcolm, Kurrajong and Mertondale.

History
The district was created on 22 August 1900, and was amended on 8 May 1907. It was described in the Government Gazette thus:

References

Land districts of Western Australia
Goldfields-Esperance